Erwood railway station is a former station on the Mid Wales Railway in Erwood, between Brecon and Llanidloes, Powys, Wales.

The station building has been reconstructed  but the platforms remain in situ. The station house is intact with extensions. 

There are three old railway carriages at Erwood on the platform edge. Two house craft exhibits and another awaits restoration. There is also a 1939 Fowler 0-4-0 industrial diesel locomotive, maker's number 22878, fleet number 'AMW No. 169', and named "Alan", which has been cosmetically restored. It is named after Alan Cunningham, the founder of Erwood Craft Centre.

The three carriages are:

 Great Western Railway six-compartment luggage composite, (body only) 
 Midland Railway six-wheel five-compartment Third (body only), built 1886
 GWR 587 Four-wheel Third (body only), built 1873

References

Further reading

External links
History of Erwood Station
Video footage of the Fowler Diesel Shunter exhibit & the station
Video of the old weighbridge at Erwood
Video of the old hand operated crane at Erwood

Buildings and structures in Powys
Railway stations in Great Britain opened in 1864
Railway stations in Great Britain closed in 1962
Disused railway stations in Powys
Former Cambrian Railway stations